Kinnaram Cholli Cholli is a 2001 Indian Malayalam film, directed by V. Murali and produced by T. Srinivasan and A. R. M. Mohan. The film stars Sindhu, David Das, Geetha and Meenu Kumar in lead roles. The film had musical score by S. P. Venkatesh.

Cast
Sindhu
David Das
Geetha
Meenu Kumar
Shakeela
Stephen
kamal

References

External links
 

2001 films
2000s Malayalam-language films